Alyaksandr Uladzimiravich Sachywka (born 5 January 1986) is a Belarusian professional footballer who plays for Dinamo Minsk.

International career
Sachywka was called up to the senior Belarus squad for a UEFA Euro 2016 qualifier against Macedonia in October 2015. He earned his first cap on 1 June 2017, playing as a starter in the 0:1 loss against Switzerland in a friendly match, being substituted shortly after the hour mark.

International goals
Scores and results list Belarus' goal tally first.

Honours
Minsk
Belarusian Cup winner: 2012–13

Shakhtyor Soligorsk
Belarusian Premier League champion: 2020, 2021
Belarusian Cup winner: 2018–19
Belarusian Super Cup winner: 2021

References

External links

Profile at FC Minsk website

1986 births
Living people
Belarusian footballers
Belarus international footballers
Association football defenders
FC Dinamo Minsk players
FC Darida Minsk Raion players
FC Minsk players
FC Shakhtyor Soligorsk players